Second Thoughts is a novel by Shobhaa De.

Synopsis
Second Thoughts is a love story about Maya, a pretty girl who is eager to escape her dull, middle-class home in Calcutta for the glamour of Mumbai, where she moves after marriage to Ranjan, a handsome, ambitious man who has an American university degree and a wealthy family background.

Maya is determined to be the ideal wife, but finds herself trapped and stifled by the confines of her arranged marriage to a man who, she discovers, is rigidly conservative and completely indifferent to her desires. She begins to experience great loneliness in suburban Mumbai.

She strikes up a friendship with Nikhil, her charming, college-going neighbor, leading to love and betrayal.

References

Novels by Shobhaa De
1996 novels
Novels set in Mumbai
1996 Indian novels